Fremington railway station served the village of Fremington, Devon, England, from 1855 to 1965 on the Bideford Extension Railway. Located at Fremington Quay, about a mile from the centre of the village.

History 
The station was opened on 2 November 1855 by the London and South Western Railway. It closed on 4 October 1965.

References 

Disused railway stations in Devon
Former London and South Western Railway stations
Railway stations in Great Britain opened in 1855
Railway stations in Great Britain closed in 1965
1855 establishments in England
1965 disestablishments in England